Codex Ebnerianus, Minuscule 105 (in the Gregory-Aland numbering), δ 257 (Soden), is a Greek language illuminated manuscript of the New Testament, though missing the Book of Revelation.

Formerly it was labeled by 105e, 48a, and 24p.

Description 
It is believed written in Constantinople at the start of the 12th century during the Comnenian Period. It is unique amongst surviving Greek New Testament manuscripts in that it places author portraits before each epistle, act and gospel, as opposed to just the gospels. This manuscript gives a good example of Greek calligraphy of the 12th century. The manuscript is marked with Georgian quire signatures, but was still in Constantinople in the 16th century.

The text is written in 1 column per page, 27 lines per page, on 426 parchment leaves (20.5 by 16 cm). Capital letters in gold.

The book itself was bound in silver inlaid with ivory and comprises 426 leaves of vellum in quarto (20.5 by 16 cm).
Synaxarion and Menologion were added by Joasaph, a calligraphist, in 1391, who also added John 8:3-11 at the end of that Gospel.

The Greek text of the codex is a representative of the Byzantine text-type. Aland placed it in Category V. It belongs to the textual family Family Kx.

History 

The codex is named after Hieronymus Wilhelm Ebner von Eschenbach (1673–1752); a Nuremberg diplomat and German Enlightenment historian, who founded a library using his extensive collection.

Formerly it was labeled by 105e, 48a, and 24p. In 1908 Gregory gave for it number 105.

It is currently housed at the Bodleian Library, Oxford, (MS. Auct. T. inf. 1. 10).

See also 
 List of New Testament minuscules
 Textual criticism
 Minuscule 501

References

External links 
 MS. Auct. T. inf. 1. 10 In the Bodleian Libraries Catalogue of Medieval Manuscripts
 MS. Auct. T. inf. 1. 10 Images available in Digital Bodleian

Illuminated biblical manuscripts
Greek New Testament minuscules
12th-century biblical manuscripts
Bodleian Library collection